Dole is a settlement in the hills east of Idrija in the traditional Inner Carniola region of Slovenia. It includes the formerly independent settlement of Črna, which was annexed in 1964.

Name
Dole was attested in historical sources as Dolech in 1500. Like related names (e.g., Dol, Dolje, and Dolič), the name is derived from the common noun dol 'small valley', referring to a local geographical feature.

Geography

Dole consists of clusters of houses and various isolated farms along the road from Idrija to Medvedje Brdo. The landscape around the hamlet of Dolenje Dole has rolling terrain with tilled fields and small meadows, and the land around the hamlet of Gorenje Dole has sinkholes and an intermittent spring. In the northern part of the village's territory, just west of the neighboring village of Ravne pri Žireh, there is a geological curiosity known as Tomaž's Table.

References

External links

Dole on Geopedia

Populated places in the Municipality of Idrija